The sixth season of M*A*S*H aired Tuesdays at 9:00-9:30PM from September 20, 1977 to January 24, 1978 and Mondays at the same time from January 30 to March 27, 1978.

Cast

Episodes

Notes

External links 
 List of M*A*S*H (season 6) episodes at the Internet Movie Database

1977 American television seasons
1978 American television seasons
MASH 06